HMS Hardi was built at Cowes c. 1795 for Spanish owners. In 1796 she became the French privateer Hardi. The Royal Navy captured her in 1797 and sold her in 1800.

Florentin Lavallée commissioned Hardi at Brest in October 1796. She was armed with eighteen 8-pounder guns and had a crew of 130-164 men under the command of Captain Cousin.

In February 1797 Hardi, Captain Cousell, captured Antelope.<ref>"News". London Chronicle (London, England), 18–21 February 1797; Issue 5889.</ref> Antelope had been sailing from Charleston to London when she was taken.

Late in March 1797 Vice-Admiral Lord Kingsmill received intelligence that a French cruiser had been seen off the Skellocks on the coast of Ireland. Kingsmill dispatched  on 28 March, and on 1 April Hazard found the French vessel. After a chase of seven hours, Hazard caught her quarry, but only because the privateer had lost both topmasts. The privateer was the brig Hardi, of 18 guns and 130 men. (Another source gives her complement as 164 men.) Hardi had been built at Cowes, about two years earlier, for the Spaniards. Hardi had left Brest on 17 March and during her cruise had escaped two British frigates that had chased her. She had captured only one prize, a small Portuguese vessel of little value. Hazard took Hardie to Cork. Hardie arrived at Portsmouth on 16 April.

The Navy acquired Hardi'', and classified her as a sloop of 18 guns. There is no record of her having seen active service.

Notes, citations, and references
Notes

Citations

References
 
 
 
 

1790s ships
Privateer ships of France
Captured ships
Sloops of the Royal Navy